is a Japanese politician of the Liberal Democratic Party, a member of the House of Representatives in the Diet (national legislature). A native of Fuji, Shizuoka and graduate of Sophia University, he attended Waseda University for graduate study and business school at the University of Washington in the United States. He was elected for the first time in 1986.

From 2001 to 2002 he was Director General of the Japan Defense Agency (now Minister of Defense).

References

External links 
  in Japanese.

Japanese defense ministers
Members of the House of Representatives (Japan)
Sophia University alumni
Waseda University alumni
University of Washington Foster School of Business alumni
Living people
1944 births
Liberal Democratic Party (Japan) politicians
Nippon Paper Industries
21st-century Japanese politicians